Ministry of Health and Population may refer to:

 Ministry of Health and Population (Egypt)
 Ministry of Health and Population (Nepal)